In enzymology, a N-acylneuraminate-9-phosphate synthase is an enzyme that catalyzes the chemical reaction

phosphoenolpyruvate + N-acyl-D-mannosamine 6-phosphate + H2O  N-acylneuraminate 9-phosphate + phosphate

The 3 substrates of this enzyme are phosphoenolpyruvate, N-acyl-D-mannosamine 6-phosphate, and H2O, whereas its two products are N-acylneuraminate 9-phosphate and phosphate.

This enzyme belongs to the family of transferases, specifically those transferring aryl or alkyl groups other than methyl groups.  The systematic name of this enzyme class is phosphoenolpyruvate:N-acyl-D-mannosamine-6-phosphate 1-(2-carboxy-2-oxoethyl)transferase. Other names in common use include N-acetylneuraminate 9-phosphate lyase, N-acetylneuraminate 9-phosphate sialic acid 9-phosphate synthase, N-acetylneuraminate 9-phosphate synthetase, N-acylneuraminate-9-phosphate pyruvate-lyase, (pyruvate-phosphorylating), and sialic acid 9-phosphate synthetase.  This enzyme participates in aminosugars metabolism.

Structural studies

As of late 2007, only one structure has been solved for this class of enzymes, with the PDB accession code .

References

 
 
 

EC 2.5.1
Enzymes of known structure